Major General James W. Duckett, (July 8, 1911 – January 21, 1991) South Carolina Unorganized Militia served as the 14th President of The Citadel from 1970 to 1974, succeeding General Hugh P. Harris.

A native of Greenwood, South Carolina he was a 1932 Honor Graduate of The Citadel earning a bachelor's degree in chemistry, Duckett joined The Citadel Chemistry department in 1934 after receiving his Master of Science in chemistry from the University of Georgia and Ph.D. from the University of North Carolina.  During World War II, Duckett served as a Chemical Corps commander and officer on active duty in the Army in the European theater of operations.  During his tenure at The Citadel, Duckett served as Dean of Admissions, Administrative Dean, the first Citadel Vice President and from 1970 to 1974 the President of the Military College of South Carolina.  He was the first President of The Citadel to hold an earned doctorate.

Duckett served as president during one of the most challenging times in the schools history dealing with anti-military sentiment from the Vietnam War, drug use and rebellious attitudes among cadets responding to the changing social attitudes of the day.

General Duckett died in 1991; Duckett Hall which houses The Citadels Biology Department is named in his honor.

References

The Citadel, The Military College of South Carolina alumni
The Citadel, The Military College of South Carolina faculty
The Citadel, The Military College of South Carolina staff
Presidents of The Citadel, The Military College of South Carolina
University of Georgia alumni
University of North Carolina at Chapel Hill alumni
United States Army generals
United States Army personnel of World War II
People from Greenwood, South Carolina
1991 deaths
1911 births
20th-century American academics